Ralph Harold Metcalfe Sr. (May 29, 1910 – October 10, 1978) was an American track and field sprinter and politician. He jointly held the world record in the 100-meter dash and placed second in that event in two Olympics, first to Eddie Tolan in 1932 at Los Angeles and then to Jesse Owens at the 1936 Olympics in Berlin, Germany. Metcalfe won four Olympic medals and was regarded as the world's fastest human in 1934 and 1935. He later went into politics in the city of Chicago and served in the United States Congress for four terms in the 1970s as a Democrat from Illinois.

Track and field career

Born in Atlanta, Georgia, Metcalfe grew up in Chicago and graduated high school from Tilden Tech in 1930. He accepted a track scholarship to Marquette University in Milwaukee, Wisconsin, and equaled the record of 10.3 seconds in the 100 m on a number of occasions, as well as equaling the 200 m record of 20.6 seconds. He became the first man to win the NCAA 200 m title three times consecutively. At the 1932 Summer Olympics in Los Angeles, he virtually dead-heated with his rival Eddie Tolan, with the gold medal awarded to Tolan only after extended study of the photograph; both recorded a time of 10.38 seconds in the 100 meters. Metcalfe also earned a bronze medal at these games, in the 200 meters. He competed again at the 1936 Summer Olympics in Berlin, and again took silver in the 100 meters, this time behind four-time gold medalist Owens. They won gold in the 4×100 meter relay with Foy Draper and Frank Wykoff; the U.S. won by 1.1 seconds over runner-up Italy, and Germany took bronze. Fierce rivals on the track, Metcalfe and Owens became lifelong friends.

1932 Olympics

Metcalfe was convinced to the end of his life that the 100 m should have been awarded as a tie between him and Eddie Tolan: "I have never been convinced I was defeated. It should have been a tie" Film evidence and that of observers of the race seem to support Metcalfe's verdict. The AAU later changed their rules to have the winner being the first athlete to cross the line not merely breast the tape. It was the latter that Tolan was judged to have done first. The AAU went further and awarded the race as a tie but the International Olympic Committee has never agreed to this change. They maintain the result stands because the judges decided in line with the rules at the time that Eddie Tolan's entire torso had passed the finish line on the ground before Metcalfe's. In addition, even though credited with same time as Tolan, 10.3 s, a time that equaled the then world record, Metcalfe's time was never ratified as a world record.

In the 200 m, Metcalfe was embroiled in further controversy. Observers at the time claimed the marking for his starting holes were 3–4 feet behind where they should have been. Others claimed this discrepancy was the result of an optical illusion because George Simpson in the lane outside cut his holes on the outside of his lane whilst Metcalfe used the inside of his. In any case, Metcalfe was offered a re-run but refused because he feared the United States would not be able to repeat its 1–2–3.

1936 Olympics

In the sprint relay, Metcalfe became involved in a controversy not of his own making. Originally the United States chose for the relay the athletes who had come 4th to 7th in the trials. Two of these athletes, Sam Stoller and Marty Glickman, were replaced with Metcalfe and Jesse Owens allegedly because the former were Jewish. Metcalfe and Owens were undoubtedly the superior sprinters but they had not done the relay baton practice and the switch went against established practice.

Whilst all world attention was on Jesse Owens winning the gold in the 100m it is often ignored that Metcalfe won the silver in an equally outstanding performance. In 2016, the 1936 Olympic journey of the eighteen Black American athletes, including interviews with Metcalfe's son, was documented in the film Olympic Pride, American Prejudice.

United States Championships

Metcalfe was United States Champion at 100 m between 1932–34 (and was 2nd in 1935–36) and at 200 m between 1932–36.

In all he won 16 national titles at the AAU Championships, NCAA Championships and Final Olympic Trials.

World records

Metcalfe 16 times broke or equaled world record times at various distances. However, only 5 of these were ever officially ratified by the athletics governing body, the IAAF. The ratified times were:
 equaled the world record for 100 m of 10.3 s on:
 12 August 1933 in Budapest, Hungary.
 15 September 1934 in Nishinomiya, Japan.
 23 September 1934 in Darien, Japan.
 equaled the world record for 200 m (straight course) of 20.6 s  on 12 August 1933 in Budapest, Hungary.
 broke the world record for the 4 × 100 m relay with 39.8 s on 9 August 1936 (United States 1936 Olympics team of Jesse Owens-Metcalfe-Foy Draper-Frank Wykoff).

Military and political career

After earning his bachelor's degree at Marquette in 1936, Metcalfe completed a master's degree at the University of Southern California in Los Angeles in 1939. Metcalfe taught political science and coached track at Xavier University in New Orleans, recruiting athletes to the University like Jimmie McDaniel and Herb Douglas. He served in the transportation corps of U.S. Army in World War II, rising to the rank of first lieutenant and awarded the Legion of Merit medal. After the war, he moved back to Chicago and later headed the state's athletic commission.

In 1955, Metcalfe won the first of four elections as an alderman representing the South Side of Chicago. He ran for an open seat in Congress in 1970 as a Democrat and was easily elected from Illinois' first district. The seat had been filled for 28 years by William L. Dawson, who was retiring at age 84 due to poor health and then died less than a week after the 1970 election. Metcalfe was a co-founder of the Congressional Black Caucus (CBC) in 1971 and later was noted for breaking ranks with Chicago mayor Richard Daley after incidents of police brutality.

Death and legacy

Metcalfe was seeking a fifth term in 1978 when he died at his Chicago home on October 10 of an apparent heart attack at age 68.

Metcalfe is interred at Holy Sepulchre Cemetery in Alsip, southwest of Chicago. A federal office building in Chicago (at 77 W. Jackson Blvd.) was named for him upon its completion in 1991.

Metcalfe was inducted into the National Track and Field Hall of Fame in 1975 and named a member of the President's Commission on Olympic Sports.

Personal

Metcalfe married Gertrude Pemberton on June 9, 1937 in Dallas, Texas.  They divorced in Los Angeles, California in 1943.  Metcalfe married Madalynne Fay Young in 1947 and they had one son. He was a member of Alpha Phi Alpha fraternity, Alpha Sigma Nu honor society, and the Corpus Christi parish in Chicago's Bronzeville neighborhood. He converted to Catholicism in 1932, while an undergraduate at Marquette.

Electoral history

See also
List of African-American United States representatives
List of United States Congress members who died in office (1950–99)

References

External links

U.S. House of Representatives history: Ralph Metcalfe
 – Olympic results
National Track and Field Hall of Fame
Georgia Sports Hall of Fame
Marquette University Athletics Hall of Fame
Marquette University, Raynor Memorial Libraries – digital archives – Ralph Metcalfe
Metcalfe Collection.org

|-

1910 births
1978 deaths
20th-century American politicians
African-American Catholics
African-American male track and field athletes
African-American members of the United States House of Representatives
African Americans in World War II
African-American people in Illinois politics
American athlete-politicians
American male sprinters
United States Army personnel of World War II
American Roman Catholics
Athletes (track and field) at the 1932 Summer Olympics
Athletes (track and field) at the 1936 Summer Olympics
Burials at Holy Sepulchre Cemetery (Alsip, Illinois)
Chicago City Council members
Democratic Party members of the United States House of Representatives from Illinois
World record setters in athletics (track and field)
Marquette University alumni
Medalists at the 1936 Summer Olympics
Medalists at the 1932 Summer Olympics
Olympic bronze medalists for the United States in track and field
Olympic gold medalists for the United States in track and field
Olympic silver medalists for the United States in track and field
Track and field athletes from Atlanta
United States Army officers
University of Southern California alumni
Converts to Roman Catholicism
USA Outdoor Track and Field Championships winners
USA Indoor Track and Field Championships winners
20th-century African-American politicians
Military personnel from Illinois
Knights of Peter Claver & Ladies Auxiliary
African-American United States Army personnel